Theodor Wedepohl (12 April 1863, Exter – 28 March 1931, New York City) was a German portrait, landscape and genre painter.

Life and work 
He spent his youth in Westphalia and in Magdeburg. He was originally self-taught, and started showing his paintings in 1878, when he was only fifteen.

As soon as he was old enough, in 1882, he began his formal studies at the Royal Academy of Arts in Berlin. After 1887, he held his first official exhibitions at the Academy, and other art venues in Berlin. From 1893, he was a regular participant at the Große Berliner Kunstausstellung.

He returned to Magdeburg in 1892, where he became a member of the  St. Lukas-Künstlervereins. He was married to Katharine née Siegmund. Their son, became a architect and university professor. In 1897, he and his family left Magdeburg; moving frequently. From 1900 to 1901, they lived in Rome, then spent the years 1904 to 1906 in Essen and Dortmund. After 1906, they divided their time between Leipzig and Berlin, where he had been appointed a Professor at the Academy.

He made an extended visit to Iceland in 1910, to paint landscapes. Sometime around 1919, after his son had left home, he bought a house with a studio in Bad Saarow, southeast of Berlin. He and Katharine lived there until 1926. Following her death, he emigrated to the United States and settled in New York City, where he died five years later.

References

Further reading 
 "Wedepohl, Theodor", In: Allgemeines Lexikon der Bildenden Künstler von der Antike bis zur Gegenwart, Vol. 35: Waage–Wilhelmson, Hans Vollmer (Ed.), E. A. Seemann, Leipzig 1942
 Peter Hastings Falk (Hrsg.): Who Was Who in American Art 1564–1975, 3. Band 1999, Nr. 3724

External links 

1863 births
1931 deaths
19th-century German painters
German landscape painters
German portrait painters
Academy of Arts, Berlin
People from Herford (district)
20th-century German painters